The 2003 NatWest Series was a One Day International cricket tri-series sponsored by the National Westminster Bank that took place in England between 26 June and 12 July 2003. The series involved the national teams of England, South Africa and Zimbabwe. Ten matches were played in total, with each team playing one another thrice during the group stage. The teams which finished in the top two positions following the group stages qualified for the final, which England won by defeating South Africa at Lord's on 12 July by 7 wickets. Preceding the series, England played Zimbabwe in a two Test series, while following the series, South Africa played England in a Test and One Day International series.

Venues

Squads

Fixtures

Final 

In what was South Africa's first One Day International appearance at Lord's, England won the toss and elected to field. For many of the South African batsman this was their first time playing on the sloping Lord's pitch, which at the start of their innings had a little moisture in and displayed even bounce. South Africa lost their captain Graeme Smith with the score on 10, dismissed by James Anderson, and soon lost Herschelle Gibbs for 9 with the score on 30. Debutant Morné van Wyk made a quickfire 17 before he was bowled by James Anderson, in what was described as the "ball of the match". Jacques Kallis came into the match with a series average of 164.50, but was dismissed for a 12 ball duck by Darren Gough, who was England's most economical bowler, with his opening spell of 7 overs conceding just 9 runs. Wickets continued to fall at regular intervals during the South African innings, with Andrew Flintoff, Ashley Giles and Gough each chipping in with two wickets, while Richard Johnson took one. James Anderson was the only England bowler to bowl his full complement of 10 overs, finishing with figures of 3/50. Jacques Rudolph top-scored in South Africa's innings with 19. South Africa were eventually dismissed for 107, with their innings lasting just 32.1 overs. This score was at the time the lowest One Day International in the 34 matches played there and remains so to this day. England's response started poorly, with Makhaya Ntini dismissing Marcus Trescothick for a nine ball duck with the score on 1. However, South Africa could not capitalise on this, with Michael Vaughan and Vikram Solanki adding 87 for the second wicket, before Vaughan was dismissed for 30 by André Nel and Solanki was dismissed by Andrew Hall one run later for 50, however by then the damage had been done. Anthony McGrath and Flintoff proceeded to lead England home to a 7 wicket victory. Following the match Flintoff was declared Man of the Series.

Statistics

References

External links 
 2003 NatWest Series  at CricketArchive

2003 in English cricket
International cricket competitions in 2003
NatWest Group